Christon may refer to:

Places
Christon, Somerset, a village in Loxton, England 
Christon Bank, a village in Northumberland, England

Surname
Lewis Christon (born 1989), English professional footballer
Phillip Christon (born 1961), American film director and screenwriter
Semaj Christon (born 1992), American professional basketball player
Shameka Christon (born 1982), American professional women's basketball player

Given name
Christon Gray (born 1986), American R&B singer and rapper
Christon Tembo (1944-2009), Zambian politician and army commander